Detective Inspector Napoleon "Bony" Bonaparte is a fictional character created by Australian novelist Arthur Upfield (1890–1964). Bony is a biracial Aboriginal Australian detective with a reputation for solving difficult cases by finding subtle clues. Upfield introduced the character in his 1929 novel The Barrakee Mystery. 29 novels featuring the character were published.

Upfield said that he based the character on Tracker Leon, a biracial Aboriginal Australian man who worked for the Queensland Police.

Biography
Napoleon "Bony" Bonaparte is the son of an Aboriginal Australian mother and a white father. He was born during a time when an interracial relationship between an Aboriginal and a white person was forbidden. Bony was found in his dead mother's arms, where he was taken in by a Catholic mission; there he was named Napoleon Bonaparte, after the French military leader who lived from 1769 to 1821.

Bonaparte (nicknamed "Bony") holds a Bachelor of Arts degree from Queensland University. He is a detective inspector with the Queensland Police. He applies his astounding tracking skills to crime investigation, and has earned a peerless reputation for solving cases. Occasionally, Queensland's criminal investigation department sends him on assignment to another jurisdiction in Australia, if a murder case there stymies the local authorities. Some of his assignments require him to work undercover. During an undercover operation, he may pose as a station hand or labourer, with only a few senior police aware of his secret identity. He sometimes uses an alias, such as Nat Bonnar or (as in Death of a Swagman) Robert Burns. When he gives his real name, he often adds "My friends call me Bony".

Bony says that he has been sacked several times for disobeying direct orders from his superiors, but adds that he is always reinstated almost immediately. He and his wife, Marie, live in Banyo, a suburb of Brisbane. They have three adult sons; the eldest, Charles, is studying to be a doctor.

Appearances

Novels

The Sands of Windee
While working on the second Bony novel, 1931's The Sands of Windee, Arthur Upfield discussed plot ideas with his outback companions. One of these companions was Snowy Rowles, a man who had previously committed three murders using methods similar to those described in Upfield's novel. When Rowles was caught, Upfield was forced to testify at his trial. The ensuing publicity surrounding the Murchison Murders—as they came to be called—greatly improved the sales of the novel. The ensuing notoriety helped to catalyze Upfield's rise to fame.

Television
Two adaptations of the Bony novels have been made for television. Both starred white actors in the role.

The first adaptation aired for two series between 1971 and 1972. Caucasian New Zealand actor James Laurenson played Bonaparte in blackface. The character's name was spelt 'Boney' for the series, and some editions of the novels kept this spelling for later editions.

There was also a 1990 telemovie and later a 1992 spin-off TV series (using the original 'Bony' spelling). The pilot film depicted the titular protagonist (here named David John Bonaparte) as the grandson of the original Bony. The series however, portrayed him as being white, and raised by Aboriginals. 
Cameron Daddo played the character. Burnum Burnum co-starred as Bony's aboriginal mentor Uncle Albert.

See also
 Fictional detectives
 List of male detective characters

References

External links
 
 

Fictional Australian people
Fictional Australian police detectives
Fictional indigenous people of Australia
Fictional people from Queensland